Simple Kapadia (15 August 1958 – 10 November 2009) was a Hindi film actress and costume designer, who was active in her professional career from 1987 until her death in 2009.

Early and personal life
Simple was born on 15 August 1958 to parents Chunnibhai and Betty Kapadia. She was raised alongside 3 siblings - elder sister Dimple Kapadia, younger sister Reem Kapadia (who died of drug overuse) and Suhail (Munna) Kapadia. She had a son Karan Kapadia with Rajinder Singh Shetty and was the aunt of Twinkle Khanna and Rinke Khanna.

Career

Acting
Simple Kapadia made her acting debut in 1977 at the age of 18 in the role of Sumitha Mathur in the film Anurodh, with her brother-in-law, actor Rajesh Khanna. She starred opposite Jeetendra in Shakka and Chakravyuha.

She played supporting roles in Lootmaar, Zamaane Ko Dikhana Hai, Jeevan Dhaara and Dulha Bikta Hai. In 1985 she starred in the art film Rehguzar opposite Shekhar Suman. Her last acting gig was an item song for Parakh in 1987.

Costume design
After her final acting gig, she became a costume designer, and designed for actors including Sunny Deol, Tabu, Amrita Singh, Sridevi and Priyanka Chopra.

In 1994 she won a National Award for her costume design in Rudaali. She later designed for Indian movies including Rok Sako To Rok Lo and Shaheed.

Filmography

As an actress

As a costume designer

Awards and nominations
 1994 - National Film Award for Best Costume Design for Rudaali

Death
Simple Kapadia was diagnosed with cancer in 2006, but continued working despite the pain. She died in a hospital in Andheri, Mumbai on 10 November 2009, aged 51.

See also
 List of Indian film actresses

References

External links
 

1958 births
2009 deaths
Deaths from cancer in India
Actresses in Hindi cinema
Gujarati people
Indian film actresses
Indian costume designers
Artists from Mumbai
Actresses from Edinburgh
20th-century Indian actresses
20th-century Indian designers
21st-century Indian designers
21st-century Indian actresses
Actresses from Mumbai
Best Costume Design National Film Award winners
Khoja Ismailism